Orhaneli is a district of Bursa Province of Turkey.

History
From 1867 until 1922, Orhaneli (then named Adranos) was part of Hüdavendigâr vilayet.

References

Cities in Turkey
Populated places in Bursa Province
Districts of Bursa Province